Gujranwala City railway station was a railway station located at Grand Trunk Road, Gujranwala, Punjab. It is no more functional.

Services

See also
 List of railway stations in Pakistan
 Pakistan Railways

References

Railway stations in Gujranwala District
Railway stations on Karachi–Peshawar Line (ML 1)
Gujranwala